Uwe Lulis (born 6 December 1965) is a German guitarist. He is the key member and producer of heavy metal band Rebellion since 2000 and is currently one of three guitarists of German band Accept. He also played guitar in Grave Digger for about 13 years, and co-wrote many songs during his time in the band. 

Lulis is a known producer and owns his studio Black Solaris Studios. He has produced other bands like Wizard, Paragon, Montany etc.

When Lulis left Grave Digger, he formed his band Rebellion together with ex-bassist of Grave Digger, Tomi Göttlich. Alongside two other members, Lulis left Rebellion in 2010.

In October 2008, Lulis broke his right leg in a motorcycle crash. Because of this, his band Rebellion used only one guitarist on their planned gigs.

On 4 December 2014, Lulis joined Accept as a replacement for guitarist Herman Frank.

Discography

With Digger (1987)
Stronger Than Ever (1987)

With Grave Digger (1987–2000)
The Reaper (1993)
Symphony of Death (1993)
Heart of Darkness (1995)
Tunes of War (1996)
The Dark of the Sun (EP) (1997)
Knights of the Cross (1998)
Excalibur (1999)

With Rebellion (2000–2010)
 Shakespeare's Macbeth – A Tragedy in Steel (2002)
 Born a Rebel (2003)
 Sagas of Iceland – The History of the Vikings Volume 1 (2005)
 Miklagard (single) (2006)
 Miklagard – The History of the Vikings Volume 2 (2007)
 Arise: From Ginnungagap to Ragnarök – The History of the Vikings Volume 3 (2009)

With Accept (2014–present)
 Symphonic Terror – Live at Wacken 2017 (2017)
 Restless and Live (2017)
 The Rise of Chaos (2017)
 Too Mean to Die (2021)

References 

German heavy metal guitarists
German male guitarists
Living people
1965 births
Accept (band) members